The 2020 Washington lieutenant gubernatorial election was held on November 3, 2020, to elect the lieutenant governor of Washington concurrently with the 2020 Washington elections. The top-two primary was held on August 4, and Democrats Denny Heck and Marko Liias advanced to the general election, which Heck won.

Incumbent Cyrus Habib surprised the state by announcing he was foregoing a run for re-election in order to join the Society of Jesus. The position was of special importance due to speculation that the incumbent Governor, Jay Inslee could have been appointed to a position in a Democratic Presidential Cabinet after winning his third term.

Background 
Habib's retirement came after Gov. Inslee dropped out of the presidential election which caused many potential statewide candidates in Washington to change their plans and drop exploratory bids.

At the time of Habib's announcement former Seattle City Council candidate Ann Davison Sattler and former US House candidate Joseph Brumbles had already been running as Republicans. The day of his retirement State Senator Steve Hobbs announced his 2nd campaign for the office of Lieutenant Governor, after losing in the 2016 Primary to then-State Senator Habib.

Nonpartisan blanket primary

Democratic Party candidates

Declared 
Denny Heck, U.S. Representative for Washington's 10th congressional district
Marko Liias, State Senator from Washington's 21st legislative district and candidate for Washington State Treasurer in 2016

Withdrew 
Steve Hobbs, State Senator from Washington's 44th legislative district

Declined 
 Lisa Brown, Washington Secretary of Commerce, former Congressional Candidate, and former State Senate Majority Leader
 Dow Constantine, King County Executive
 Cyrus Habib, incumbent Lieutenant Governor

Endorsements

Republican Party candidates 
 Joseph Brumbles, former Congressional candidate
 Ann Davison Sattler, former Seattle City Council candidate, former staffer for John Paul Hammerschmidt
 Marty McClendon, Perennial Candidate
 Dick Muri, former State Representative from Washington's 28th legislative district

Minor party candidates

Declared 
 Jared Frerichs (Libertarian), former Candidate for Walla Walla County Commission, Consultant
Mark Greene (Revived Citizens Party), Perennial Candidate

Polling

Results
A top-two primary took place on August 4. All candidates are listed on the same ballot regardless of party affiliation and the top two advanced to the general election in November.

General election
After being eliminated in the August 4th gubernatorial primary, Joshua Freed announced that he would be running for lieutenant governor as a write-in candidate. A debate between Heck and Liias was held on October 22.

Polling

Results

By congressional district
Heck won 9 of 10 congressional districts with the remaining one going to Liias.

Notes

References

External links 
Official campaign websites
 Denny Heck (D) for Lieutenant Governor
 Marko Liias (D) for Lieutenant Governor
 Joshua Freed (R) for Lieutenant Governor

2020
Lieutenant Governor
Washington